Michael Heath may refer to:

 Mike Heath (born 1955), baseball player
 Michael Heath (cartoonist) (born 1935), British strip cartoonist and illustrator
 Michael Heath (computer scientist) (born 1946), computer scientist who specializes in scientific computing
 Mike Heath (swimmer) (born 1964), former American Olympic swimmer
 Michael Heath (Paralympic swimmer) (born 1989), Canadian Paralympic swimmer
 Michael Heath, the Recorder of Lincoln
 Michael G. Heath, Chargé d’ Affaires a.i. of the U.S. Mission in Thailand

See also
 Mickey Heath (1903–1986), baseball player